Varushamellam Vasantham is a 2002 Indian Tamil-language film directed by Ravi Shankar and produced by R. B. Choudary. The film featured the Manoj, Kunal and Anita Hassanandani, while M. N. Nambiar plays a supporting role. The film, which had music composed by Sirpy, opened in May 2002. The film was remade in Telugu as Manchivaadu.

Plot
Raja (Manoj) is an unemployed, carefree, lazy young man who lives in Pollachi with an extended family consisting of his grandfather (M. N. Nambiar), grandmother, parents, uncle, aunt and paternal cousins. Raja also has a brother Ramesh. Ramesh being a year younger than Raja, and works as a successful software engineer in Delhi. The grandfather is a rich and well respected retired IAS officer, who favours Ramesh since Ramesh is well-educated and obedient. He often speaks ill of Raja and degrades him constantly, going so far as to leave him out of his daily prayers.

Raja's grandfather's niece, husband and daughter, Latha (Anita Hassanandani), move from Kolkata to Raja's home to stay for a short while. Raja instantly develops feelings for Latha, and tries to befriend her. He soon finds out that Ramesh is also attracted to Latha and is determined to win her over. Raja realises that he needs to impress Latha so that she will choose him over Ramesh, and tries to change his lifestyle. Taking the advice of a friend, he tries to get a job as a collector, but he is turned away due to his lack of education. He then tries to learn English, but he is so hopeless that his teacher eventually gives up.

Ramesh, in the meanwhile, tries to sabotage his brother's efforts. He convinces Raja that Latha is very fond of 'sapota', a fruit which she actually hates and is allergic to. Raja delivers baskets of sapota to Latha, but she has an allergic reaction, and this causes a rift in their friendship. Raja is disheartened after his many failures and the attitude of his brother and grandfather. His hope is renewed one day after a conversation with Latha, where she mentions that wealth and education should not affect the love two people have for each other. She says that a single flower bought by a person who works hard is worth more than gifts worth thousands.

Raja eventually finds a job at a metal factory, where he works long hours doing dangerous work. His grandfather witnesses Raja working, overhears some of the labourers talking about what a hard worker he is, and sees a change in his grandson and softens his approach towards him.

Latha celebrates her 23rd birthday with a grand party, and Ramesh presents her with a costly laptop computer. Ashamed, Raja tries to hide his gift – some cheap clothing wrapped in plain paper, but Latha insists on trying on the outfit immediately. The grandfather realises that the change in Raja was brought about by Latha, and proposes a marriage between the two. To everyone's surprise, Raja declines, despite the fact that he loves Latha. The grandfather is embarrassed and enraged, telling Raja he will never find a girl who is educated and well-respected like Latha. He also says that Raja will forever be useless and lazy, and threatens to cut off his grandsons inheritance. Raja decides to move out and continue working at the metal factory.

Ramesh, who was aware of Raja's feelings towards Latha, confronts his brother about his rejection of the marriage proposal. Raja reveals that Latha had confided in him that she is actually in love with Ramesh. Shocked, Ramesh asks his brother why he didn't just stay silent and accept the marriage, but Raja says that love should come from both sides and cannot be forced. Ramesh is astonished by this and is grateful for Raja's kind character. He asks for forgiveness and the brothers reconcile. The grandfather overhears this conversation and is overcome with guilt. After an emotional exchange, he welcomes Raja back home and now treats his him with affection and love, and speaks of him with pride.

Cast 

Manoj as Raja
Kunal as Ramesh
Anita Hassanandani as Latha
M. N. Nambiar as Paramasivam, Raja & Ramesh's grandfather
Sukumari as Meenakshi
Nalini as Latha's mother
Subhashini as Raja's mother
Sanghavi in cameo appearance 
Anandaraj as Inspector in Guest Appearance 
Madhan Bob as Latha's father
Anu Mohan
Mayilsamy as Tea shop owner
Pandu
Raghava Lawrence in a special appearance in "Naan Ready Neenga Readya"

Production
After working as an assistant director and lyric writer in the 1990s, Ra. Ravishankar debuted as a film director through Varushamellam Vasantham.
Raghava Lawrence was initially signed to act in a leading role in the film, alongside Manoj, but was later replaced by Kunal though Lawrence made a cameo appearance for a song.

Soundtrack 
The film's soundtrack was composed by Sirpy. Sirpy introduced singer Ganga through the album for the film, opting to retain her rough copy track for a song initially meant to be sung by Sujatha Mohan.

Release and reception 
The film opened in May 2002 to positive reviews, with a critic from The Hindu noting it was "a neat family drama that is not completely crisp". Screen wrote "With good performance from the artistes and melodious music by Sirpy and Rajarajan’s cinematography capturing the scenic beauty of the countryside, the film is a good family entertainer." Tulika of Rediff called the film a "clean family drama" and wrote that "Sirpy's music complements the typical story. Cinematography, editing and other departments blend well, but fail to deliver a sensational film". Malini Mannath of Chennai Online wrote "It is the director's first work and he shows promise. Setting his ambience well, moving his narration fairly engagingly, handling effectively the scenes of one-upmanship between siblings who fall in love with the same girl. But the narration tends to drag at times, and it is the comedy track that keeps it going then".

Awards
The film won two Tamil Nadu State Film Awards, one for Best Lyricist and one for Best Male Singer.

References 

2002 films
2000s Tamil-language films
Indian romantic drama films
Tamil films remade in other languages
2002 directorial debut films
2002 romantic drama films
Super Good Films films